This is a list of sites notable as destinations of Christian pilgrimage, sorted by region and by (modern) country.

This page has a wider view of the topic, while the "pilgrimage church" page offers Catholic sites.

Old World

The Holy Land

The Holy Land, location of many events in the Old Testament and New Testament. After Jerusalem, the list is alphabetical.
 Jerusalem, site of the Passion (The Via Dolorosa), the site of Crucifixion and Resurrection of Jesus (The Calvary in The Church of the Holy Sepulchre), Ein Karem in westernmost Jerusalem is the birthplace of John the Baptist, Cenacle is traditionally considered be the site of the Last Supper, Monastery of the Cross in central Jerusalem is the site of Jesus' Cross trees which the Cross made from.
 Abu Ghosh - of one of the resting places of the Ark of the Covenant and the town identified by the Crusader as biblical Emmaus. 
 Beit Jimal Monastery - the traditional burial site of  St Stephen, the first Christian martyr, St Nicodemus, and - only to Christians - that of Rabban Gamliel.
 Caesarea Maritima
 Caesarea Philippi
 Cana in Galilee
 Deir Rafat Monastery - Catholic Shrine of Our Lady Queen of Palestine and of the Holy Land (Notre-Dame de Palestine) in the Elah Valley.
 Ein Karem, the traditional birthplace of St John the Baptist, with several churches dedicated to his family, birth, and ministry.
 Emmaus - different places identified as biblical Emmaus, where Jesus revealed himself to two disciples after his resurrection
 Emmaus Nicopolis - the most traditional site identified as Emmaus, with ruins of Byzantine and Crusader churches and home to the Catholic community of Beatitudes.
 see Al-Qubeiba under Palestine: the West Bank
 Hebron, the site of Cave of the Patriarchs where the Patriarchs and Matriarchs Abraham and Sarah, Isaac and Rebecca, Jacob and Leah are believed to be buried.
 Jaffa (Joppa), the site of the house of Simon the Tanner where St Peter has risen St Tabitha from the dead and also her eventual burial site.
 The Jesus Trail.
 Lod (Lydda) - the traditional birth and burial site of Saint George, one of the most venerated Christian martyrs.
 Mount Carmel, site of Elijah's famous challenge to the prophets of Baal.
 Mount Tabor, site of the Transfiguration
 Nain, the site of the Raising of the son of the widow of Nain, one of Jesus' miracles.
 Nazareth, hometown of Jesus.
 Sea of Galilee, the sites of Jesus' ministry.
 Bethsaida - the birthplaces of many of Jesus' Apostles - Philip, Andrew, Peter (John 1:44; John 12:21), and perhaps also James and John.
 Capernaum, the "town of Jesus" with the House of St Peter.
 Magdala the birthplace of Mary Magdalene
 Mount of Beatitudes - where Jesus is believed to have delivered the Sermon on the Mount.
 Tabgha - the place of the first miracle of the multiplication of the loaves and fishes.
 Sepphoris, the site of the home of Anne and Joachim, parents of Virgin Mary

 Beit Sahour the site of the Adoration of the shepherds ("Shepherds' Field").
 Bethany, site of the resurrection of Lazarus.
 Bethlehem - the birthplace of Jesus, marked in particular by the Church of the Nativity.
 Burqin Church. According to Christian tradition, Jesus had passed through Burqin on his way to Jerusalem from Nazareth and as he was passing by the village he heard cries for help from ten lepers who were isolated in quarantine. He encountered them and passed his hand on their faces and then they were immediately cured. Since this miracle, the church became a station for many Christian pilgrims. This is also one of the world's oldest churches.
 Deir Hijla, or Saint Gerasimos Monastery - located on the site where Mary, Joseph and Jesus used to rest during the Flight to Egypt. Also the place of the lavra of Saint Gerasimos. Near Jericho and Qasr al-Yahud.
 Jacob's well in Nablus.
 Jericho - the site of the Mount of Temptation and of the Sycomore Tree of Zacchaeus.
 Mar Saba, the most important and largest monastery in the Holy Land and the resting place of Saint Sabas which was also the monk who built this monastery.
 Qasr al-Yahud - part of the traditional site of the baptism of Jesus by John the Baptist (see Al-Maghtas and Bethany Beyond the Jordan). On the west bank of the Jordan River near Jericho. Has many abandoned Christian monasteries, only the Greek Orthodox monastery of St John has reopened.
 Al-Qubeiba ("Franciscan Emmaus") - as the Franciscan tradition sees this as the biblical Emmaus, they built a large church at the site.

Eastern Christianity
Sites associated with Eastern Christianity in Eastern Europe and the Near East (excluding the Holy Land proper).

Armenia

Etchmiadzin Cathedral
Khor Virap

Artsakh (de facto)
Ghazanchetsots Cathedral

Bulgaria

Rila Monastery - largest and most famous Eastern Orthodox monastery in Bulgaria.

Egypt

Saint Catherine's Monastery, Mount Sinai, traditional site of the Burning Bush and the reception of the Ten Commandments has been commemorated since the time of Constantine the Great
Monastery of Saint Anthony, a Coptic Orthodox monastery/cathedral located in the Eastern Desert. It is a very important model for many monastics.

Georgia

Mtskheta. Svetitskhoveli Cathedral 11th century, Jvari (monastery) 6th century (UNESCO World Heritage Sites)
David Gareja monastery complex. A rock-hewn monastery complex founded in the 6th century
Vardzia. A cave monastery site in southern Georgia
Gelati Monastery. The monastery contains the Church of the Virgin founded in 1106, and the 13th-century churches of St George and St Nicholas (UNESCO World Heritage Site)

Greece

Mount Athos. Orthodox monastic centre.
Tinos.
Patmos. Traditionally the island where John the Apostle received Revelation.
Saint Nicholas of Spata Road to Saint Nicholas.

India

St Mary's Martha Mariyam Major Arch Episcopal Pilgrim Centre, Kuravilangad, Kerala. The place is believed Mother Mary's first appearance in the world.
 St. Thomas Church, Thumpoly Alleppey Kerala. (Marian Pilgrimage Shrine of Alappuzha ).
St Alphonsa's Tomb shrine, Bharananganam, Kerala. The place is blessed with the tomb of first religious sister Catholic saint of India.
St. Peter and St. Paul's Church, Parumala, Orthodox Syrian Church containing the tomb of Saint Mar Gregorios.
Mor Ignatius Dayro Manjinikkara, Omallur, Kerala
St. Mary's Church, Thiruvithamcode, Tamil Nadu, considered to be World's oldest still standing church structure.
Marthoma CheriyaPally Church
St. Thomas Mount. Place where St. Thomas was martyred.
Basilica of Our Lady of Good Health, Velankanni, Tamil Nadu, A Marian and Infant Jesus apparition site. One of the largest Catholic pilgrimage sites in Asia.
 Divine Mercy Shrine of Holy Mary Thodupuzha, Kerala is a Marian apparition site.
 Shrine of the Infant Jesus, Nashik, Maharashtra
St. George Orthodox Church Puthuppally Pally, Kerala is an international Georgian pilgrim center
St. Mary's Forane Church of Korattymuthy Koratty, Kerala is a Marian pilgrimage shrine.
 St. Joseph's Pilgrim Church, Peringuzha, Muvattupuzha, Kerala

Iran 
St. Thaddeus Monastery.

Jordan 

Alphabetically by noun, ignoring the Arabic article (al-, el-)
 Anjara, Our Lady of the Mount Church - built around a cave, where by tradition Jesus, the Virgin Mary and the disciples rested during a trip between Jerusalem and Galilee.
 Machaerus - the Herodian fortress where John the Baptist was imprisoned and beheaded.
 Bethabara (Al-Maghtas) - the site of the baptism of Jesus, recognised by all major Christian denominations. On the east bank of the Jordan River across from Jericho. See also Bethany beyond the Jordan.
 Mount Nebo - traditional site of the death of Moses and where he looked over to the "promised land"
 Tell Mar Elias outside Ajloun - ruins of a large Byzantine church dedicated to the Prophet Elijah the Tishbite and located in the area of biblical Tishbe in Gilead.

Lebanon 

Our Lady of Lebanon (Harissa, Keserwan District)
Monastery of Qozhaya (Wadi Qozhaya, Zgharta District)
 Monastery of Saint Maron (Annaya, Byblos District) - Sanctuary of Saint Charbel
 Monastery of Saint Joseph (Jrabta, Batroun District) - Sanctuary of Saint Rafqa
 Monastery of Saints Cyprian and Justina (Kfifan, Batroun District) - Sanctuary of Saint Nimatullah
 Qana Al Jaleel (Qana, Tyre District), where it is believed that Jesus Christ performed His first miracle, transforming water into wine at the Marriage at Cana.

Romania

Iași, where over 1 million pilgrims from all over Romania and neighboring Orthodox countries supposedly queue to touch the relics of Saint Paraskevi

Russia

Diveyevo Monastery, the main shrine of St. Seraphim of Sarov
Trinity Lavra of St. Sergius, the main shrine of St. Sergius of Radonezh
Pokrovsky Monastery, the main shrine of St. Matrona of Moscow
Valaam Monastery, the main pilgrimage centre in the North-West of Russia

Serbia

Djunis monastery near Kruševac is the most visited shrine in Serbia, dedicated to the Theotokos

Syria

Saidnaya
Soufanieh Marian apparition in a suburb of Damascus
Maaloula, one of the last three places in the world along with Al-Sarkha (Bakhah) and Jubb'adin where Western Aramaic, the dialect of Jesus Christ, is still spoken. The Convent of Saint Thecla (Maaloula) and Monastery of Mar Sarkis are notable pilgrimage sites.
Damascus, where Paul the Apostle saw the light and was baptized by Ananias, in the House of Ananias on Street Called Straight. Home to the Greek Orthodox Patriarchate of Antioch, Syriac Catholic Patriarchate of Antioch, and the Melkite Catholic Patriarchate of Antioch.
Monastery of Saint Moses the Abyssinian, hosts precious frescoes dating to the 11th and 12th century, and recent discoveries suggest that the ruins may date back 10 000 years.
Saint Mary Church of the Holy Belt in Homs dates back to 59 AD and contains a venerated Holy Girdle that is supposed to be a section of the belt of Virgin Mary.
Umayyad Mosque, formerly a church, is said to contain to this day the head of John the Baptist. In 2001, Pope John Paul II visited the mosque and became the first pope ever to set foot in a mosque.
Saint George's Monastery, Homs in Al-Mishtaya was established in the 5th century and its icons depict scenes from the lives of Saint George and Jesus Christ. It also displays many other ancient items like crosses, writings, books, carvings, goblets, and other tools. Saint George is a popular saint among Middle Eastern Christians, and the monastery is busiest during pilgrimages at the feast of Saint George (May 6) and the feast of the elevation of the Holy Cross on September 14.

Turkey

House of the Virgin Mary located in Ephesus. The former home of the Virgin Mary until her Assumption/Dormition is a shrine blessed and declared a place of pilgrimage for Christians by Pope John Paul II.
Constantinople, today known as Istanbul. Former capital of the Byzantine Empire and the see of one of the five ancient Patriarchates and first among equals among the patriarchs of the Eastern Orthodox Church. Hagia Sophia, former cathedral and burial place of many Ecumenical Patriarchs. The worldwide capital of the Greek Orthodox Church and home to many of the oldest churches in the world. It is home to the Church of St. George seat of the Patriarch of Constantinople leader of the Greek Orthodox Church.
Antioch. Considered to be "the cradle of Christianity", Antioch is an early center of Christianity and formerly the seat of the Antiochian Orthodox Church. Home to many old Christian churches.

Ukraine

Pochayiv Lavra
Holy Mountains Lavra
Kiev Monastery of the Caves

Western Christianity
Sites associated with Western Christianity (Roman Catholicism, including sites now in Protestant parts of Europe).

Austria
 Mariazell. Marian shrine to Austria and Hungary

Belgium
 Banneux - Apparitions of the Blessed Virgin Mary in 1933 
 Beauraing - Apparitions of the Blessed Virgin Mary in 1932 .

Bosnia and Herzegovina
 Medjugorje - Apparitions of the Blessed Virgin Mary in 1981

Czech Republic
 Dub nad Moravou - Stará Voda church
 Jablonné v Podještědí - Saint Lawrence Basilica 
 Infant Jesus of Prague
 Křtiny
 Maria Hilf
 Nepomuk - the birthplace of St. John of Nepomuk
 Stará Boleslav
 Svatý Kopeček
 Velehrad

Finland
 Kirkkokari, the only Roman Catholic pilgrimage site in Finland.

France
 Sanctuary of Our Lady of Lourdes. A very important Marian apparition shrine for Catholics.
 Cathedral of Chartres
 Conques
 St Trophimus' Church, Eschau
 Issoudun
 La Salette, Our Lady of La Salette
 Saint Catherine Labouré of Paris
 Pellevoisin. Apparition of the Virgin Mary.
 Taizé Community, modern monastery that actively encourages pilgrimages to it.

 The several churches and basilicas in Lourdes - associated with Marian apparitions receive over 5 million pilgrims a year, making Lourdes the second most visited Christian pilgrimage site in Europe after Rome.
 Paris - the cathedral of Notre Dame de Paris, and Basilica of Sacré-Coeur in Montmartre
 Basilica of St. Thérèse (Lisieux) - in Normandy. The second pilgrimage site in France after Lourdes, with over 2 million visitors per year.

Germany
 Basilica of the Vierzehnheiligen.
 St. Maria in der Kupfergasse, Cologne
 Kevelaer
 Cologne Cathedral. 
 Shrine of the Three Kings
 Altötting
 Marian pilgrimage of Neviges, Velbert
 Werl pilgrimage

Hungary
 Máriapócs

India
Basilica of Bom Jesus, Goa, contains the Tomb of Saint Francis Xavier
Basilica of Our Lady of Good Health, Vailankanni, Tamil Nadu is a 16th-century Marian apparition site.
Thumpoly Church St. Thomas Church, Thumpoly.

Ireland
 Croagh Patrick mountain in County Mayo, associated with Saint Patrick and Reek Sunday
 Glendalough, County Wicklow, associated with Saint Kevin
 Máméan, Maumturk Mountains, County Galway, associated with Saint Patrick
 Knock Shrine, Knock, County Mayo, site of an 1879 apparition of the Virgin Mary
 Skellig Michael, an ancient monastic island
 St. Patrick's Purgatory, County Donegal, another site associated with Saint Patrick

Italy
 Padua, St Anthony, relics
 Padua, Saint Luke, relics
 Sacri Monti, the Sacred Mountains of Piedmont and Lombardy.
 Turin Cathedral, the home of the Shroud of Turin.
 St. Peter's Basilica, the place of many burials since that of Saint Peter
 
 Vatican City - location of  Saint Peter's Basilica, relics of various saints (such as John Paul II), relics of the Passion of Christ, and headquarters of the Roman Catholic Church
 Rome - the site of the deaths of early martyrs (Colosseum), the sanctuaries of many saints, such as Ignatius of Loyola, and papal basilicas with important relics
 Padre Pio Pilgrimage Church - the shrine of Saint Padre Pio at San Giovanni Rotondo in Apulia; also Pietrelcina as the birthplace of Padre Pio
 Basilica of St. Francis in Assisi; also the church of Saint Clare
 Loreto in the Marche; home of the Basilica della Santa Casa
 Lanciano in Abruzzo - the site of the famous Eucharistic miracle
 Venice - the shrine of Saint Mark the evangelist and patron saint of Venice
 Padua - the sanctuary of St Anthony of Padua
 Monte Cassino - the shrine of Saint Benedict
 Amalfi near Naples - the sanctuary of Saint Andrew
 Salerno in Campania - the shrine of Saint Matthew
 Pavia near Milan - the tomb of St. Augustine of Hippo at the church of San Pietro in Ciel d'Oro

Latvia
 Aglona -  Basilica of the Assumption, Aglona

Lithuania

 Divine Mercy Sanctuary (Vilnius) with the first Divine Mercy image
 Hill of Crosses, near Šiauliai
 Our Lady of the Gate of Dawn, Vilnius
 Šiluva
 Vilnius Cathedral (relics of Saint Casimir)
 Žemaičių Kalvarija, Samogitia

Netherlands
 (Heilige Stede)Holy Site, Amsterdam
 Kapel in 't Zand, Roermond of Limburg
 Lourdesgrot or Lourdes Grotto, a 1:13 scale replica of the Sanctuary of Our Lady of Lourdes of Massabielle, France found in the Lourdeskapel (Scheveningen), The Hague-Scheveningen, Netherlands
 Chapel of Our Lady, Echt, Limburg

Norway
 Nidaros, Trondheim.  Shrine of St. Olav. 4th most visited pilgrimage site in Middle Ages.

Poland

 Jasna Góra Monastery in Częstochowa, where the Black Madonna of Częstochowa is housed permanently. It receives about 4–5 million pilgrims a year.
 The Sanctuary of Our Lady of Licheń in Licheń Stary, the home of the miraculous image, known as the Sorrowful Queen of Poland (Bolesna Królowa Polski). This developing complex receives over a million pilgrims a year.
 Divine Mercy Sanctuary in Kraków-Łagiewniki, the global center of Divine Mercy, with the most popular version of Divine Mercy image, as well as the grave of saint Faustina Kowalska. It receives millions of pilgrims from all around the world.
 Góra Świętej Anny
 Kalwaria Zebrzydowska
 Matka Boska Kębelska in Wąwolnica
 Sanctuary of Our Lady of Ludźmierz in Ludźmierz
 Sanctuary of St. Hedwig  in Trzebnica
 Supraśl Lavra
 Święta Lipka
 Wambierzyce

Portugal

 Sanctuary of Our Lady of Fátima – is one of the largest Marian shrines in the world. Our Lady of Fátima is the title given to the Blessed Virgin Mary according to her apparitions to three shepherd children at Cova da Iria, in Fátima, on the 13th day of six consecutive months in 1917. Fátima, Portugal, receives about 20 million pilgrims a year.
 Sanctuary of Christ the King – is a famous Catholic monument and shrine dedicated to the Sacred Heart of Jesus Christ, place of many pilgrimages.
 Church-Shrine of the Sacred Heart of Jesus – situated in Ermesinde, is an important pilgrimage destination to visit the tomb with the incorrupt body of Blessed Mary of the Divine Heart Droste zu Vischering.
 Sanctuary of Balazar – an important pilgrimage destination since the 20th century due to the Portuguese mystic Alexandrina Maria da Costa, died 1955, who gained fame as a Saint, beatified by Pope John Paul II.
 Sanctuary of Our Lady of Sameiro – is an important shrine located in Braga dedicated to the cult of the Immaculate Conception of the Blessed Virgin Mary. Pope John Paul II visited this sanctuary to promote the cult through Virgin Mary by all catholic people.

Spain
 Santiago de Compostela - in Galicia on the Way of St. James. This famous medieval pilgrimage to the shrine of Saint James is still popular today.
 San Sebastián de Garabandal - a rural village in Cantabrian mountains where occurred the famous apparitions of Our Lady of Mount Carmel and Saint Michael the Archangel.
 Sanctuary of Chandavila - a Marian shrine dedicated to the apparitions of Our Lady of Sorrows in La Codosera, province of Badajoz.
 Sanctuary of Onuva - a Marian shrine dedicated to the apparitions of Our Lady of Graces occurred near La Puebla del Río, province of Seville.
 Sanctuary of Our Lady of Umbe - a Marian shrine dedicated to the apparitions of Our Lady of Sorrows in Umbe, near Bilbao, Biscay.
 Sanctuary of the Holy Christ of Agony - shrine with the Miraculous Crucifix where Jesus Christ appeared alive on the Cross, situated in Limpias, Cantabria.
 Sanctuary of Our Lady of Covadonga - a significant Marian shrine situated in the Peaks of Europe range of mountains, Asturias.
 The Basilica and Sanctuary of Our Lady of Candelaria, Tenerife, is a Marian shrine dedicated of Our Lady of Candelaria, patron saint of the Canary Islands.
 Ávila, the birthplace of Saint Theresa of Jesus and first foundation of a convent of Discalced Carmelite nuns.
 Basilica of Our Lady of the Pillar in Zaragoza. It is reputed to be the first church dedicated to Virgin Mary in history.
 Basilica of Caravaca de la Cruz, situated in the region of Murcia.
 Montserrat, Catalonia. The Virgin of Montserrat is housed permanently in the Monastery of Santa Maria de Montserrat.
 The Royal Monastery of Santa Maria de Guadalupe situated in Guadalupe, Cáceres.
 The Monastery of Santo Toribio de Liébana located in Cantabria.
 The Way of Saint James. The Way of Saint James is the pilgrimage route to the Cathedral of Santiago de Compostela in Galicia in northwestern Spain, where tradition has it that the remains of the apostle Saint James are buried.

Romania
 Miercurea Ciuc, Transylvania. Whit Sunday gathering of (mostly ethnic Hungarian) Catholics.

Slovakia

Greek Catholic 
 Shrine of Our Lady of Litmanová, a Marian apparition.
 Basilica minor of the Dormition of the Mother of God of Ľutina, largest Greek Catholic pilgrimage in Slovakia, held every August 15

Roman Catholic 
 Gaboltov - Marian site
 Korňa-Živčákova - Marian site
 Levoča-Mariánska hora - Largest pilgrimage in, held every first Sunday in July, Marian site, 650 000 attending in 1995 is the largest number of participants of any event in Slovak history.
 Marianka
 Nitrianska Blatnica
 Skalka nad Váhom
 Šaštín - National pilgrimage every September 15 to the patron saint of Slovakia, Virgin Mary
 Turzovka - place of Marian apparitions
 Úhorná - pilgrimages every August 5

Switzerland
 Einsiedeln

United Kingdom
 Bardsey Island, Wales. Numerous relics of local saints, including Saint Cadfan
 Church of St Peter's-on-the-Wall Bradwell-on-Sea, England. The oldest church in England (Saint Cedd)
 Bromholm Priory, England. Claimed to possess a piece of the True Cross
 Bury St Edmunds Abbey, England. Associated with Saint Edmund the Martyr
 Canterbury Cathedral, England. Associated with Saint Thomas Becket
 Glastonbury, England. Saint Joseph of Arimathea
 Durham Cathedral, England. Contains the relics of Saint Cuthbert
 Hailes Abbey, England. Claimed to possess a phial of the Blood of Christ
 Iona, Scotland. Centre of Gaelic Monasticism. Associated with Saint Columba
 Holywell, Wales. St Winefride's Well is claimed to be the oldest continuously operating pilgrimage site in Great Britain
 Lindisfarne, England. Saint Cuthbert's remains were removed in 875, and were transferred to Durham Cathedral in 1104
 Peak Pilgrimage, Peak District, England. From Ilam, Staffordshire (a place of pilgrimage since St Bertram, a Saxon saint and hermit) to St Lawrence's church in the Plague Village of Eyam, Peak District
 St Albans Cathedral, England. Associated with the country's first martyr, Saint Alban
 St Andrews Cathedral, Scotland. For the recently revived pilgrimage tradition here see The Way of St Andrews
 St Andrews, Scotland. It is said that Saint Andrew was given, by God, directions to the location of St Andrews
 St David's, Wales. Pilgrimage site since canonisation of Saint David in the 12th century
 Struell Wells, Northern Ireland. Traditionally associated with Saint Patrick
 Walsingham, England. Virgin Mary apparition site
 Waltham Abbey, England. Medieval site of the Holy Cross of Waltham
 Winchester Cathedral, England. Associated with Saint Swithun

New World
Pilgrimage sites in parts of the world reached by Christianity in the early modern or modern era, including the Americas, Sub-Saharan Africa and Southeast and East Asia.

Sub-Saharan Africa

Rwanda
Our Lady of Kibeho, Kibeho, Rwanda.  It receives about 25,000-30,000 visitors per year.

Uganda
Basilica of the Uganda Martyrs, Namugongo, Namugongo, Wakiso District, Uganda

East and Southeast Asia

Japan

Our Lady of Akita -approved Marian apparition by the Catholic Church
Twenty-Six Martyrs Museum and Monument, Site of the execution of twenty-six Japanese Christians in 1597.

South Korea

official international pilgrimage, Seoul Martyrs Way

Indonesia

Sendangsono. Central Java; The first native java baptized by Rv. Van Lith, SJ

Malaysia

St. Anne's Church, Bukit Mertajam, mainland Penang state

Philippines

National Shrine of Our Mother of Perpetual Help. One of the most venerated Marian images in Asia.
Our Lady of Manaoag is one of the Philippines' most widely visited Roman Catholic Pilgrimage sites and the patroness of the sick, the helpless and the needy.
Our Lady of Peñafrancia in Naga City is the patroness of ailments, moreover, the whole Southern Luzon. It is considered to be the one of the largest Marian pilgrimages in Asia.
Quiapo Church. Home to the much venerated Black Nazarene, a much venerated statue of Jesus Christ which many people believe has miraculous attributes

Vietnam
Our Lady of La Vang - Marian apparition approved public veneration by the Catholic Church

Latin America

Brazil

Basilica of the Shrine of Our Lady of Aparecida - one of the largest churches in the world and receives about 8 million visitors per year.

Costa Rica

Basilica of Our Lady of the Angels - the pilgrims walk from all around the country with the goal of arriving on 2 August to the Basilica in Cartago, that date is the feast day of the feast day of Our Lady of the Angels of the Portiuncula (on which the Portiuncola Indulgence could be gained) and a national holiday due to the pilgrimage.

Mexico

Basilica of Our Lady of Guadalupe - one of the largest churches in the world and receives about 20 million pilgrims per year. It can accommodate 40,000 people for a mass.
Zapopan, Jalisco.
 Virgin of San Juan de los Lagos, Jalisco.
Sanctuary of Chalma, Ocuilan, State of Mexico
Holy infant of Atocha, Fresnillo, Zacatecas.
Santa Catarina Juquila (St. Catherine), Oaxaca.
 Our Lady of the Rosary in Talpa de Allende, Jalisco.
Cerro del Cubilete, Silao, Guanajuato, Where every year receives 5 million people to see the Christ of the mountain.
 Hermosa Provincia Temple, Guadalajara, Jalisco, Main temple of the followers of the "La Luz del Mundo" denomination.

Honduras

 The Basilica of Our Lady of Suyapa (Spanish: Basílica de Nuestra Señora de Suyapa or Basílica de Suyapa) in Tegucigalpa, Honduras, is the largest church in Honduras. Dedicated to the Marian apparition of Our Lady of Suyapa, it receives approximately 1.2 million pilgrims each year on February 3, arriving from other parts of Honduras and the world.

Guatemala

 Nuestra Señora de la Merced, Antigua, Guatemala

North America

Canada
 Martyrs' Shrine, Ontario, in memory of the Canadian Martyrs
 Basilica of Sainte-Anne-de-Beaupré, Quebec, associated with miraculous healings.
 Cap-de-la-Madeleine, Quebec, in honour of Our Lady of the Cape.

United States

Roman Catholic
Immaculata Church in Cincinnati, Ohio; Catholics journey here to "Pray the Steps" on Good Friday, walking up 150 steps from the Ohio River to the top of Mount Adams while saying a prayer at each step.
 National Shrine of The Divine Mercy (Stockbridge, Massachusetts) dedicated to Divine Mercy
 Carey, Ohio, to the Basilica and National Shrine of Our Lady of Consolation; Catholic pilgrims from the Middle East journey here to mark the Feast of the Assumption
 Basilica and National Shrine of St. Elizabeth Ann Seton, in Emmitsburg, Maryland
 National Shrine Grotto of Our Lady of Lourdes, in Emmitsburg, Maryland
 The National Shrine of Our Lady of Czestochowa in  Doylestown, Pennsylvania.
 The National Shrine of Our Lady of Good Help, site of the Marian apparition in Champion, Wisconsin.
 The National Shrine of North American Martyrs in Auriesville, New York
 The Basilica of the National Shrine of Our Lady of Fatima, Lewiston, New York.
 The Black Madonna Shrine in Eureka, Missouri.
 El Santuario de Chimayo, New Mexico.
 Mission San Xavier del Bac, in Tucson, Arizona.
 Basilica of Mary, Queen of the Universe, in Orlando, Florida.
 The Shrine of Our Lady of Guadalupe, in La Crosse, Wisconsin.
 Shrine of Our Lady of Mariapoch, in Burton, Ohio. A place of pilgrimage for Byzantine and Hungarian-American Catholics.
 Our Lady of Victory Basilica, in Lackawanna, New York.
 The 21 mission churches of the El Camino Real trail of California, particularly Mission San Carlos Borromeo de Carmelo in Carmel and Mission San Diego de Alcalá in San Diego.

Eastern Orthodox
 Spruce Island, in Alaska, United States, hermitage of St. Herman of Alaska.

References

List
Christian